The Pro Football Hall of Fame is the hall of fame for professional American football, located in Canton, Ohio. Opened on September 7, the Hall of Fame enshrines exceptional figures in the sport of professional football, including players, coaches, officials, franchise owners, and front-office personnel, almost all of whom made their primary contributions to the game in the National Football League (NFL).

As of the Class of 2023, there are a total of 371 members of the Hall of Fame. Between four and nine new inductees are normally enshrined every year. For the 2020 class, a 20-person group consisting of five modern-era players and an additional 15 members, known as the "Centennial Slate", were elected to the Hall of Fame to celebrate the 100th anniversary of the NFL.

The Chicago Bears have the most inductees, with 30 (36, including players with minor portion of their career with team).

History

The city of Canton successfully lobbied the NFL to have the Hall of Fame built and has cited three reasons. First, the NFL was founded in Canton on September 17, (at that time it was known as the American Professional Football Association). Second, the now-defunct Canton Bulldogs were a successful pro football team and the NFL's first repeat champion (in 1922 and 1923). Third, the Canton community held a fundraising effort that garnered nearly $400,000 to get the Hall of Fame built. Groundbreaking for the building was held on August 11, and the Hall of Fame was opened to the public on September 7, .

In April , ground was broken for the first of many expansions. This first expansion cost $620,000, and was completed on May 10, . The pro shop opened with this expansion. This was also an important milestone for the Pro Football Hall of Fame, as yearly attendance passed the 200,000 mark for the first time. This was at least in some part due to the increase in popularity of professional football caused by the advent of the American Football League and its success in the final two AFL-NFL World Championship games.

In November 1977, work began on another expansion project, costing $1,200,000. It was completed in November 1978, enlarging the gift shop and research library, while doubling the size of the theater. The total size of the hall was now , more than 2.5 times the original size.

The building remained largely unchanged until July 1993. The Hall then announced yet another expansion, costing $9,200,000, and adding a fifth room. The most notable addition was the GameDay Stadium, which shows an NFL Films production on a  Cinemascope screen.

In 2013, the Hall of Fame completed its largest expansion and renovation to date; the total size of the hall is now .

Hall of Fame Village

Hall of Fame Village, an estimated $900 million expansion project adjacent to the Pro Football Hall of Fame, completed Phase I of construction in 2022, a Phase II is planned .

Executive directors or presidents
Dick McCann (April 4, 1962 – November 1967)
Dick Gallagher  (April 1968 – December 31, 1975)
Pete Elliott  (February 1979 – October 31, 1996)
John Bankert  (November 1, 1996 – December 31, 2005)
Steve Perry  (April 24, 2006 – January 2014)
David Baker (January 6, 2014 – October 16, 2021)
Jim Porter (2021 – present)

Inductees

Through 2022, all players in the Hall, except Buffalo Bills guard Billy Shaw, played at least some part of their professional career in the NFL; Shaw played his entire career in the American Football League (AFL) prior to the 1970 AFL–NFL merger.

Though several Hall of Famers have had AFL, Canadian Football League, World Football League, United States Football League, Arena Football League and/or Indoor Football League experience, and there is a division of the Hall devoted to alternative leagues such as these, to this point no player, coach or contributor have made the Hall without having made significant contributions to either the NFL, AFL, or All-America Football Conference.

For CFL stars, there is a corresponding Canadian Football Hall of Fame; only one player, Warren Moon, and two coaches, Bud Grant and Marv Levy, are enshrined in both halls.

Again for the Arena Football League, there is also a corresponding Arena Football Hall of Fame; similarly, only one player, Kurt Warner, has been enshrined into both halls. The Indoor Football League, in which Terrell Owens played one season, has also established a Hall of Fame.

The Chicago Bears have the most Hall of Famers among the league's franchises with either 37 or 30 enshrinees depending on whether players that only played a small portion of their careers with the team are counted.

Selection process

Selection Committee
Enshrinees are selected by a 49-person committee, largely made up of media members, officially known as the Selection Committee.

Each city that has a current NFL team sends one representative from the local media to the committee; a city with more than one franchise sends one representative for each franchise.

There are also 15 at-large delegates, including one representative from the Pro Football Writers Association. Except for the PFWA representative, who is appointed to a two-year term, all other appointments are open-ended, and terminated only by death, incapacitation, retirement, or resignation.

Voting procedure

To be eligible for the nominating process, a player or coach must have been retired for at least five years; any other contributor such as a team owner or executive can be voted in at any time.

Fans may nominate any player, coach or contributor by simply writing via letter or email to the Pro Football Hall of Fame. The Selection Committee is then polled three times by mail (once in March, once in September, and once in October) to eventually narrow the list to 25 semifinalists. In November, the committee then selects 15 finalists by mail balloting.

A Seniors and Contributors Committee, subcommittees of the overall Selection Committee, nominate Seniors (those players who completed their careers more than 25 years ago) and Contributors (individuals who made contributions to the game in areas other than playing or coaching). The Seniors Committee and Contributors Committee add one or two finalist(s) on alternating years, which makes a final ballot of 18 finalists under consideration by the full committee each year.  Committee members are instructed to only consider a candidate's professional football contributions and to disregard all other factors.

The Selection Committee then meets on "Selection Saturday", the day before each Super Bowl game to elect a new class. To be elected, a finalist must receive at least 80% support from the Board. At least four, but no more than eight, candidates are elected annually.

2020 Centennial Slate
In 2020, a special Blue-Ribbon Panel selected an additional 15 new members, known as the Centennial Slate, to be inducted into the Hall of Fame to celebrate the 100th anniversary of the NFL. Among these 15 members, ten would be seniors. On January 11, during the weekend of the NFL divisional playoffs, Hall of Fame president David Baker went on the set of The NFL Today to personally tell Bill Cowher, who was working as an analyst on that pregame show, that he was selected as one of the members of the Centennial Slate.

One day later, Baker went on the set of Fox NFL Sunday to inform Jimmy Johnson, working as an analyst on Fox's studio show, that he was also selected. The rest of the Centennial Slate members were revealed on January 15.

The remaining 13 members of the Centennial Slate elected to the Hall of Fame in 2020 are: Jim Covert, Winston Hill, Harold Carmichael, Duke Slater, Ed Sprinkle, Steve Sabol, Alex Karras, Bobby Dillon, Donnie Shell, George Young, Cliff Harris, Mac Speedie, and former NFL Commissioner Paul Tagliabue.

They were enshrined in 2021 due to COVID-19, but are still considered part of the Centennial Class of 2020.

Enshrinement ceremony

The enshrinement ceremony is the main event of the annual Enshrinement Week Powered by Johnson Controls that kicks off every NFL season. The celebration is held in Canton, throughout the week surrounding the enshrinement ceremony. All members of the Hall of Fame are invited to attend the annual ceremony.

Enshrinees do not go into the Pro Football Hall of Fame as a member of a certain team. Rather, all of an enshrinee's affiliations are listed equally. While the Baseball Hall of Fame plaques generally depict each of their inductees wearing a particular club's cap (with a few exceptions, such as Catfish Hunter and Greg Maddux), the bust sculptures of each Pro Football Hall of Fame inductee make no reference to any specific team. In addition to the bust that goes on permanent display at the Hall of Fame, inductees receive a distinctive Gold Jacket, and previous inductees nearly always wear theirs when participating at the new inductee ceremonies.

Previous induction ceremonies were held during the next day (Sunday from 1999–2005, Saturday in 2006), situated on the steps of the Hall of Fame building.

Starting in 2002, the ceremony was moved to Fawcett Stadium (now Tom Benson Hall of Fame Stadium), where it was held from 1963 to 1965. Since 2007, the enshrinement ceremony has been held on the Saturday night, since 2017 two days after the Hall of Fame Game. In 2022, the ceremony was moved to noon ET.

Hall of Fame Game

The Hall of Fame Game, the annual NFL preseason opener, is played in Tom Benson Hall of Fame Stadium at Hall of Fame Village in Canton, Ohio. In 2017, the Hall of Fame Game was held for the first time on Thursday night. The preseason classic kicks off Enshrinement Week Powered by Johnson Controls and officially kicks off the NFL preseason.

Black College Football Hall of Fame
The Pro Football Hall of Fame museum includes a permanent exhibit recognizing the inductees of the Black College Football Hall of Fame. The two organizations partnered in 2016, also creating the Black College Football Hall of Fame Classic played at Tom Benson Hall of Fame Stadium.

Ralph Hay Pioneer Award

The Ralph Hay Pioneer Award is an American football award given by the Pro Football Hall of Fame periodically to an individual who has made significant and innovative contributions to professional football. The award is named after Canton Bulldogs owner and National Football League founder and chief organizer Ralph Hay. It was originally called the Daniel F. Reeves Pioneer Award, named after Los Angeles Rams owner and hall of fame inductee Dan Reeves. The award is the highest and the most prestigious honor given by the Pro Football Hall of Fame, other than enshrinement. As of 2022, Steve Sabol, Art McNally, Marion Motley and Bill Willis are the only people to receive the award and also become a Hall of Fame inductee.

Honorees

Criticism

The small number of candidates elected each year has helped foster what some perceive as an inequality of representation at certain positions or in certain categories of player, to the exclusion of defensive players in general (defensive backs and outside linebackers in particular), special teams players, wide receivers, and those from the "seniors" category. There has also been criticism that deserving players have been overlooked because they played most or all of their careers on poor teams.

In 2009, a New York Times article criticized the Hall for not including punter Ray Guy on its ballot, erroneously stating that the Hall did not have an inductee at the time representing the position (Yale Lary, who played both as a safety and punter, had been inducted in 1979, while Sammy Baugh had also punted in addition to his quarterback play; the punter position was not specialized until free substitution became widespread in the 1960s, and most punters until then also played another position). Guy was eventually inducted as part of the 2014 class for the Hall of Fame.

The Pro Football Hall of Fame is unique among North American major league sports halls of fame in that officials have been generally excluded. Only two figures, both inducted for their work as supervisor or director of officiating as opposed to game officiating—1966 inductee Hugh "Shorty" Ray and 2022 inductee Art McNally—have been enshrined; McNally is the only inductee in the Hall to have experience as an in-game official. The National Baseball Hall of Fame and Museum, Naismith Memorial Basketball Hall of Fame and Hockey Hall of Fame have each inducted game officials as members.

Another prominent absence from the Hall is sports-journalist Howard Cosell, who has yet to either be awarded the Pete Rozelle Radio-Television Award or even get fully inducted despite his well-known association with Monday Night Football; an August 2010 Sports Illustrated article hints that Cosell may have even been "blacklisted" by the NFL.

As the late 2010s approached, a number of controversial and polarizing figures began to reach eligibility for the Hall. For example, Darren Sharper's career achievements make him a candidate for the Hall, but there is debate over whether he should be inducted due to his conviction on multiple rape and drug distribution charges after he retired.

Terrell Owens' exclusion from the Hall in his first two years of eligibility despite his strong individual statistics was a subject of public debate: while Owens was elected to the Hall of Fame in 2018, he refused to attend the enshrinement ceremony.

See also
 List of Pro Football Hall of Fame inductees
 Touchdown Club Charities Hall of Fame
 Canadian Football Hall of Fame
 Arena Football Hall of Fame
 Indoor Football League Hall of Fame
 Dick McCann Memorial Award—sometimes referred to as the "writer's wing" of the Pro Football Hall of Fame
 Pete Rozelle Radio-Television Award
 John Bunn Award: the Naismith Basketball Hall of Fame's comparable award
 Buck O'Neil Lifetime Achievement Award: the National Baseball Hall of Fame's comparable award.

References

External links

 

 
1963 establishments in Ohio
American football trophies and awards
Awards established in 1963
Buildings and structures in Canton, Ohio
Halls of fame in Ohio
Museums in Stark County, Ohio
Sports museums in Ohio
Tourist attractions in Canton, Ohio